John Munn (1807 – September 29, 1879) was a Scottish-born merchant and political figure in Newfoundland. He represented Conception Bay from 1842 to 1848 and Harbour Grace from 1869 to 1873 in the Newfoundland and Labrador House of Assembly as a Conservative.

Mann was born at Port Bannatyne near Rothesay in Scotland, the son of Stewart Munn and Isabella Fisher, and came to St. John's in 1825. He worked there as a bookkeeper until 1833, when he moved to Harbour Grace and opened a business with Captain William Punton. The company became involved in the seal trade and shipbuilding. Munn married Naomi Munden in 1838. In the 1870s, Munn's company purchased Thomas Ridley's assets. He helped found the Union Bank and served as a director. He also owned the Harbour Grace Standard newspaper. Munn was named to the Legislative Council in 1855; he served until 1869. Munn died in England in 1879, in Southport, Lancashire. After his death, his company was taken over by his son, William Punton Munn, and nephew, Robert Stewart Munn. William Munn's son, John Shannon Munn (John Munn's grandson), was also prominent in Newfoundland business circles until his death in the wreck of the SS Florizel in 1918.

In 2016, John Munn was named a National Historic Person.

References

Members of the Newfoundland and Labrador House of Assembly
1807 births
1879 deaths
Scottish emigrants to pre-Confederation Newfoundland
Members of the Legislative Council of Newfoundland
Newfoundland Colony people
Persons of National Historic Significance (Canada)